Simon Brown (born 23 June 1989) is a professional rugby league footballer who last played as a  or  for Hunslet in Betfred League 1.

Early career
Brown was a member of the Leeds Rhinos Academy and represented England at youth team level.

Leeds Rhinos
Brown played for Doncaster on loan from the Leeds Rhinos in 2010.

Sheffield Eagles
Midway through the 2010 season he joined Sheffield. He spent two and a half seasons with the South Yorkshire club before leaving at the end of the 2012 season. In 2012 he won the Championship Grand Final against Featherstone Rovers.

York City Knights
Brown joined the York City Knights ahead of the 2013 season.

Halifax RLFC
He spent only a single season at York before moving to Halifax for the 2014 season.

During the 2014 season he spent time on loan at the Batley Bulldogs.

At the conclusion of his contract at ’Fax he moved to the Hunslet Hawks. He spent the 2015 and 2016 seasons at Hunslet.

Return to Sheffield
Brown returned to the Sheffield Eagles for the 2017 season. During this period the Eagles were forced to play in Wakefield at their Belle Vue ground.

He left the club during a period of financial uncertainty ahead of the 2018 season. Brown came out of retirement to play for the Eagles during their 2018 Championship campaign.

Hunslet RLFC
On 4 Dec 2019 it was announced that Brown had joined Hunslet RLFC on a permanent 1-year deal after the earlier loan period from Dewsbury Rams.

References

External links

1989 births
Living people
Batley Bulldogs players
Dewsbury Rams players
English rugby league players
Rugby league five-eighths
Rugby league halfbacks
Halifax R.L.F.C. players
Hunslet R.L.F.C. players
Sheffield Eagles players
York City Knights players